Miriam Schnitzer (born 14 January 1977) is a former professional tennis player from Germany.

Biography
Born in Freiburg, she is one of two children of Gaby and Walter Schnitzer. She was introduced to tennis by her father at the age of four.

Competing professionally from 1994, Schnitzer attained her best ranking of 109 in the world in 1999 and won four titles on the ITF circuit.

All of her five main draw appearances at grand slam level, including three at Wimbledon, came after getting through qualifying. She made the second round of the 1998 US Open, by beating Ukraine's Elena Tatarkova. In qualifying for the 2000 US Open she had wins over Daniela Hantuchova and Virginie Razzano.

Her best WTA Tour performance was a quarter-final appearance at the 2001 German Open in Berlin. Playing as a wildcard, she beat Francesca Schiavone, Nathalie Tauziat and Denisa Chladkova, before falling to Justine Henin. She had earned her wildcard into the draw after winning the German Indoor Championships.

She retired from professional tennis in 2002.

ITF finals

Singles (4–5)

Doubles (0–1)

References

External links
 
 

1977 births
Living people
German female tennis players
Sportspeople from Freiburg im Breisgau
Tennis people from Baden-Württemberg